John David Barrett (born July 1, 1958) is a Canadian retired ice hockey player.

Career
A defenceman, Barrett was selected in the 1978 NHL Entry Draft by the Detroit Red Wings with whom he spent most of his NHL career. His older brother Fred was also an NHL defenceman. Both of their careers were cut short by injuries. Following repeated kneecap breaks, John retired after 488 NHL games, recording 20 goals, 77 assists, (97 points), and 604 penalty minutes.

As a youth, he played in the 1970 Quebec International Pee-Wee Hockey Tournament with a minor ice hockey team from Gloucester, Ontario.

Career statistics

References

External links
Profile at hockeydraftcentral.com

Profile from legends of hockey.net

1958 births
Living people
Adirondack Red Wings players
Binghamton Whalers players
Canadian ice hockey defencemen
Detroit Red Wings draft picks
Detroit Red Wings players
Ice hockey people from Ottawa
Minnesota North Stars players
Washington Capitals players
Windsor Spitfires players